The European Athlete of the Year award is an annual prize awarded to sportspeople participating in athletics, including track and field, road running and cross country running competitions. The election has been organised by the European governing body for the sport of athletics, the European Athletic Association (EAA), since 1993.

Each year, a shortlist is created by selecting the top European athlete in each event, based upon performances at the year's major championships. Only in exceptional circumstances will more than one athlete be shortlisted per event. Athletes who have served a doping ban of two years or more are ineligible. Via the EAA website, fans, media and members of the EAA federations are allowed to vote for five male and five female athletes on the list, with athletes receiving one to five points based on their ranking. A panel of experts also cast their votes. The votes of each of the four groups comprises 25% of the athletes' total scores, and the male and female athletes with the highest combined points totals win.

The European Athletics Rising Star of the Year award was inaugurated in 2007. The award, open to athletes under 23 years of age, was created as a way of acknowledging young competitors' achievements on their way to becoming senior athletes.

Waterford Crystal sponsored the event from 2002–2008 and Mondo, a manufacturer of track and field equipment and facilities, sponsored the 2009 presentation.

Long-distance runner Mo Farah of Great Britain is the only athlete, male or female, to win the main award three times. Czech javelin legend Jan Železný, British triple jumper Jonathan Edwards with his Swedish rival Christian Olsson, and Norwegian hurdler Karsten Warholm have won the men's award twice, while Sweden's heptathlete Carolina Klüft, the Russian pole vaulter Yelena Isinbayeva, Croatian high jumper Blanka Vlašić and Dutch sprinter Dafne Schippers have won the women's award twice each. Only Karsten Warholm has completed the triple of the Rising Star award, followed by two senior awards. Three athletes have completed the double of the Rising Star trophy, followed by the senior award: sprinter Christophe Lemaitre of France, Great Britain's heptathlete Jessica Ennis-Hill, and Dutch hurdler Femke Bol.

Carolina Klüft and Christophe Lemaitre were the youngest European Athletes of the Year so far. They were only 20 when winning this accolade in 2003 and 2010 respectively.

Winners

Rising Star winners

See also

 European Athlete of the Month

References
General
Spain's Domínguez named women's European Athlete of the Year. European Athletics (2009-10-01). Retrieved on 2009-10-02.
Britain's Idowu named men's European Athlete of the Year. European Athletics (2009-10-02). Retrieved on 2009-10-02.
Specific

External links
 EAA Homepage

Awards established in 1993
Sport of athletics awards
Athlete
Most valuable player awards
Athletics in Europe
year